Jodean Williams  (born 11 November 1993) is a Jamaican sprinter competing primarily in the 200 metres. She represented her country at the 2017 World Championships reaching the semifinals.

International competitions

Personal bests

Outdoor
100 metres – 11.46 (+0.6 m/s, Kingston 2016)
200 metres – 22.95 (+0.8 m/s, Kingston 2017)
400 metres – 53.29 (Kingston 2017)

References

1993 births
Living people
Jamaican female sprinters
World Athletics Championships athletes for Jamaica
Central American and Caribbean Games bronze medalists for Jamaica
Competitors at the 2018 Central American and Caribbean Games
Central American and Caribbean Games medalists in athletics
20th-century Jamaican women
21st-century Jamaican women